The Office of Treaty Settlements (in Māori: Te Tari Whakatau Take e pa ana ki te Tiriti o Waitangi) was an office within the New Zealand Ministry of Justice tasked with negotiating settlements due to historical breaches of the Treaty of Waitangi. It reported and provided advice on policy and negotiations to the Minister of Treaty of Waitangi Negotiations.

The functions of the organisation were to:
 Advise the government on generic Treaty issues, including overall strategies for settling historical Treaty claims;
 Advise and assist claimant groups to ensure well-mandated, large natural groups of claimants are ready to enter negotiations;
 Negotiate with Māori on behalf of the Crown;
 Implement settlements;
 Ensure that the Crown undertakes research into historical Treaty grievances and has its position represented at Waitangi Tribunal hearings; and
 Advise on the acquisition, management, transfer and disposal of Crown-owned property for Treaty claim purposes.

The Office of Treaty Settlements also administered many of the Treaty of Waitangi Settlement Acts, for a list of these see the list of Treaty settlements.

The office was originally formed in 1988, as the Treaty of Waitangi Policy Unit within the Department of Justice. It was set up to advise on policy and assist in negotiations and litigation of Māori treaty claims and at the Waitangi Tribunal.

The office's role is now handled by Te Arawhiti, the Office for Māori Crown Relations.

References

External links
Office of Treaty Settlements

Government agencies of New Zealand
Treaty of Waitangi